Lluxita (Aymara lluxi shell of a mussel; landslide, -ta a suffix, also spelled Llojeta) is a  mountain in the Bolivian Andes. It is located in the Cochabamba Department, Tapacari Province. Lluxita lies southeast of Q'ara Willk'i.

References 

Mountains of Cochabamba Department